KFRO (1370 AM) is a terrestrial American radio station licensed to Longview, Texas, United States. The station serves the Longview-Tyler-Kilgore area. KFRO is owned by RCA Broadcasting, LLC.

Translator

History
James R. Curtis received a license in 1924 to operate KFRO on 1220 kilohertz in Ft. Worth, Texas. However, financial problems forced Curtis to abandon the plans for the Ft. Worth station, and later revive the KFRO license on 1370 kHz in Longview. According to the 60th anniversary of KFRO (Longview News Journal Suppliment), Rogers Lacy, maternal uncle of James R.Curtis, offered to fund $5000.00 for the equipment needed to get KFRO on the air. Lacy wanted to build Longview into a city, and knew that radio would do exactly that. Mr. Curtis packed his small family and his law practice and moved to Longview.

On October 30, 1933 Voice of Longview received a construction permit to build a 100-watt radio station on 1370 kHz in Longview. The location was listed as a generic "local hotel" for both transmitter and studios (as that was what the larger market stations were doing, renting space in hotels).

The call letters KFRO stand for "Keep Forever Rolling On".

KFRO "The Voice of Longview" signed on the air on February 6, 1935 on 1370 kilohertz with a power of 100 watts daytime by owner J.R. Curtis. The original studio building and transmitter for KFRO was at the northwest corner of S. Green Street (then known as Texas State Highway 149) and Radio Street on the southern edge of town. The original KFRO studio building still exists as of 2020 and is a private residence.

In 1935 KFRO tried to move its frequency to 1210, but was stopped after an experimental period on 1210.

In 1935 First Baptist Church of Longview first started to broadcast its services on KFRO. This made the First Baptist Church Broadcast the third longest-running program in broadcasting (The Grand Ole Opry (November 28, 1925) on WSM is longest-running show and Music and the Spoken Word (July 15, 1929) on KSL are the second longest). First Baptist ceased the broadcasts after 73 years.

On October 7, 1936 KFRO powered up from 100 watts to 250 watts from the location on Radio Street in South Longview.

For two years (until 1937), Rogers Lacy (legendary oil wildcatter in Longview) was partners with J.R. Curtis. On July 24, 1937 James R. Curtis became full owner of "The Voice Of Longview".

On March 18, 1937, KFRO covered the New London School explosion, in which approximately 300 students and teachers were killed in the deadliest school building disaster in US history. Ironically, the victims of the explosion were taken to the Jacksonville, Texas hospital. The Jacksonville Hospital later became the headquarters of Waller Broadcasting, the one time owners of KFRO.

In 1937, KFRO's studios moved to 620 Glover-Crim Building Suite 411 in downtown Longview.

In 1938 Jerry Doggett, LA Dodgers announcer, got his start on KFRO. He left KFRO in 1941 to go to WRR in Dallas.

In 1939 KFRO's transmitter moved to its current site, the property behind the J.R. Curtis mansion at 2118 East Marshall Avenue (Hwy 80). At the new transmitter site there were three towers erected, which allowed KFRO to be a full-time station. KFRO's new transmitter was an RCA BTA-1D. At that time KFRO was an RCA turn-key station. KFRO runs 1 kilowatt with one tower daytime, and 1 kilowatt three-tower directional at night.

In 1940 Grant Turner of Baird, Texas joined the KFRO air staff. Turner was known as the "Voice of the Grand Ole Opry. In 1981 Turner was inducted into the Country Music Hall of Fame. Turner also sang, and had several duet albums with Helen Carter on the Tennessee and Republic labels. He also performed on the Grand Ole Opry.

In 1947, KFRO moved into the former home of the Hurst Eye, Ear, Nose, and Throat Hospital on Methvin Street in downtown Longview and renamed it the Curtis Building. The new studios were very plush, with grand piano, harp, and room for a full band. The Hurst Hospital building was built in 1919 by Dr. V.R. Hurst, and was located on Methvin Street, between the U.S. Post Office and the Hilton Hotel.

In 1941 the U.S. Federal Communications Commission shifted all of the frequencies above 710 kilohertz to make room for more stations, and more Clear Channel frequencies, but 1370 KFRO was never moved off of its original frequency. It is unknown how J.R. Curtis achieved this.

In 1953, The East Texas Hillbilly Jamboree debuted on KFRO. The show opened at the Rita Theatre starring Claude King and the Roadrunners, and some 30 other entertainers. The East Texas Hillbilly Jamboree was started to capitalize on the popularity of the WSM Grand Ole Opry in Nashville, and the KWKH Louisiana Hayride in Shreveport. With the close proximity of Longview to Shreveport KFRO was hoping to siphon some of the Louisiana Hayride's talent and audience. But due to KFRO's limited signal the show failed. WSM and KWKH had national audiences due to the 50,000-watt signals.

In the 1980s, Curtis moved KFRO to new facilities at 481 East Loop 281 near N. Fourth St, in northeast Longview.

The Curtis Building and the former Hilton Hotel were torn down in the early 1990s and the site is now occupied by Heritage Plaza.

In the mid-1980s J.R. Curtis Jr. bought 95.3 KNIF Gilmer, on December 5, 1986 95.3 became KAEZ, and moved the studios to Longview. 95.3 then became KLSQ on September 17, 1990. On March 1, 1993 95.3 was rebranded as KFRO-FM, and the format changed to oldies (1950s and 1960s rock and roll and pop), and was called "The Frog". On December 7, 1998 95.3 became KCGL, and then back to 95.3 KFRO-FM February 15, 1999. 95.3 has been just about every format in the book, including Beautiful Music, Easy Listening, Country, Top-40, Oldies, Spanish, Smooth Jazz, Soft Rock, and now a Top-40 mix variety format. The most successful time in 95.3's history was the oldies era when the station was known as "The Frog".

Throughout KFRO's history it has been every network affiliation (except NBC/NBC Red). It has been Mutual, TSN, Keystone, ABC/NBC Blue, CBS, CNN, ESPN, and Fox. KFRO was last a Fox News affiliate. Until May 2013 KFRO was an affiliate of the Moody Bible Institute, but has since dropped the service in favor of Fox Sports Radio.

KFRO remained in the Curtis family for 63 years until the late J.R. Curtis Jr. sold the station in 1998.

Sunburst years
On June 15, 1998, the KFRO stations were bought by Sunburst, who moved KYKX into the KFRO building on the Loop. The Sunburst group included 105.7 KYKX Longview, 104.1 KKUS Tyler, 100.7 KPXI Overton, 1370 KFRO Longview, and 95.3 KFRO-FM Gilmer. At that point "Voice of Longview" Broadcasting ceased to exist. A few months after the sale, J.R. Curtis Junior died in a motorcycle accident. A few months after that J.R. Curtis Senior, founder of KFRO died.

Waller years
On October 18, 2000 KFRO, KFRO-FM, KKUS, and KYKX were sold to Waller Media of Jacksonville. Sunburst's KPXI was sold to Salem, and lowered power so that they could raise the power on their Dallas station 100.7 KWRD-FM. Under Waller's ownership KFRO's format changed many times. From Urban AC, to ESPN, to Music Of Your Life (standards), Oldies, and talk. The Waller group of stations included 1370 KFRO Longview, 95.3 KFRO-FM Gilmer, 105.7 KYKX Longview, 104.1 KKUS Tyler, 106.5 KOOI Jacksonville, 1400 KEBE Jacksonville, 96.7 KOYE Frankston, and 102.3 KLJT Jacksonville. In 2004 Waller leased and bought 103.1 KDVE and 100.3 KXAL.

Access.1/East Texas Radio Group years
On January 7, 2005, KFRO was purchased by Access.1 (East Texas Radio Group), and became a tri-mulcast of Classic Country 104.1 KKUS, Tyler. Access.1 moved KFRO from its 20+ year home in the Curtis Building at 481 E Loop 281, to its current home at 4408 North US Highway 259 in Longview where the audio loops through, KYKX is also in the building. KFRO was being run from a small six-channel mixer in the KKUS control room in Tyler, this ended with the simulcast of The Ranch.

On January 1, 2015, Access.1 entered into a three-year LMA with Alpha Media. Alpha Media will run KFRO, while Access.1 will retain ownership of the station. Alpha Media purchased KFRO's sister stations KYKX, KKUS, KOOI, and KOYE. Alpha also purchased the Access.1 stations in Shreveport, Louisiana.

November 30, 2015 Access.1 ceased to exist, and the last three remaining stations, KFRO, KCUL-FM, and KSYR, were folded into a new holding company, A.1 Investco LLC. A.1 Investco is controlled directly by Todd Boehly, the CEO of Guggenheim Capital. On March 1, 2016 Guggenheim filed with the FCC to transfer control from the former CEO of Guggenheim, Todd Boehly, to the new CEO, Kevin Gundersen.

RCA Broadcasting
On November 1, 2016, RCA Broadcasting (owner of 1410 KZEY), and A.1 Invesco entered into an agreement to sell 1370 KFRO and its assets to RCA Broadcasting. The LMA with Alpha and Access.1 was canceled by both parties in February 2017. FCC approval was granted and the deal was consummated on February 3, 2017. Concurrently, Fox Sports programming ceased on 1370 KFRO.

On March 20, 2017, KFRO was taken silent due to transmitter damage caused by a lightning strike. On January 18, 2018, KFRO returned to the air. The station's programming is recorded talk.

On January 31, 2018, RCA Broadcasting filed a request to obtain a construction permit to build an FM translator for KFRO at 95.9 MHz, from tower 2 at the KFRO transmitter site on highway 80. The application was granted for the translator on June 11, 2018, and the frequency changed to 95.7 MHz, as K239CT. Effective November 18, 2022, the translator moved to 94.1 MHz, as K231DK.

Present programming
Following the Christmas format, and beginning January 2, KFRO began stunting with continuous Star Trek and Sci Fi theme music until 8pm February 6.

On February 6, 2022, at 8pm, the 87th anniversary of KFRO's first broadcast, KFRO aired a live broadcast of "Galaxy Moonbeam Night Site", celebrating the 87 years of KFRO and highlighting the glory years of KFRO.

At 9PM, immediately following Galaxy, owner Scott Rice, thanked all that had contributed to the station, and helped with the station's acquisition and equipment. Then opened the station in prayer. Then the music was started, with the first song being Frank Mills' Music Box Dancer, dedicated to Rice's late mother, and KFRO changed to a full service oldies station, once again as "The Voice of Longview".

Former programming
Until May 2013, KFRO and 1410 KCUL simulcast the Moody Bible Institute's satellite radio feed called "The Way". The station stunted in preparation for the format change for over two weeks.

The former KFRO/Ranch on air staff included East Texas radio broadcasting legend Tom Perryman, East Texas' only true radio legend. In the late 1940s Perryman started his career at 1400 KEBE "The KEBE Corral" in Jacksonville, Texas. In the mid-1950s he was at KSIJ (now KEES) 1430 in Gladewater, Texas. While there, he brought Elvis Presley to East Texas, and gave Elvis some of his first work. It was also at KSIJ that Perryman met Jim Reeves, Floyd Cramer, and Johnny Horton. Perryman went on to host the Opry Star Spotlight on The Air Castle of the South 650 WSM in Nashville, and became one of the most famous Opry announcers of all time. Before leaving WSM, he hired his replacement, Ralph Emery. Perryman and Jim Reeves then bought KGRI-AM-FM in Henderson, Texas. Later Perryman and Mary Reeves bought WMTS-AM-FM in Murfreesboro, Tennessee. The Perrymans and Mary Reeves sold WMTS-AM-FM in the early 1980s, and Perryman went into retirement. He was convinced to come back to East Texas by Dudley Waller (former owner of KKUS) and Rick Guest (former GM of Waller and Access.1/East Texas Radio Group), to boost the ratings of the fledgling classic country station (The Ranch). Perryman agreed to join the Ranch.

From 2017-2021, 1370 KFRO was the 24/7 home of the Galaxy Nostalgia Network, which exclusively produces "Galaxy Moonbeam Night Site", a nostalgia, history, and educational talk show. KFRO continues to be the key station of the Galaxy Nostalgia Network.

Sports
KFRO was the first Longview radio home of the Dallas Cowboys. KFRO was the original home of the Lobos.

Engineering
1370 KFRO is a class B station. KFRO is 1 kilowatt day non-directional (1 tower), 1 kilowatt night directional (three towers). The KFRO towers are 177 feet tall. The current KFRO transmitter building was built in 2003. KFRO signed on in 1935 with a 100-watt homemade transmitter. In 1935 KFRO increased its power to 250 watts with a Western Electric transmitter. In 1941 power was increased to 1,000 watts and a new RCA BTA-1D was installed, it stayed in service until 1983, when it was replaced by a Rockwell Collins 820-D2. The Rockwell Collins transmitter was made to run C-QUAM AM Stereo, which made KFRO the first AM stereo station in East Texas. The Collins-Rockwell was replaced in 2003 with a used 1978 Harris MW-1 solid state. In June 2019, a C-QUAM AM stereo exciter was reinstalled at the station.

Former sister stations
1370 KFRO Longview is owned by RCA Broadcasting LLC, its East Texas former sister stations are:

 104.1 KKUS Tyler (sold to Alpha Media)
 105.7 KYKX Longview (sold to Alpha Media)
 96.7 KOYE Frankston (sold to Alpha Media)
 106.5 KOOI Jacksonville (sold to Alpha Media) 
 1410 KCUL Marshall (sold to RCA Broadcasting, LLC)
 92.3 KCUL-FM Marshall (was in a long term LMA with Alpha Media, then sold to RCA Broadcasting, LLC October 1, 2019)

KFRO legend

The longtime program director of 1370 KFRO, Charlie Thomason (from 1983 to 2004), died at the control board of KFRO in the main control room at 481 East Loop 281, on June 6, 2004. When Thomason died a stain appeared on the carpet. The concrete was treated and carpet replaced, but the stain continues to reappear. The building was last the home of KFRO 1370, KFRO-FM 95.3, KYKX 105.7, KXAL 100.3, and KDVE 103.1. The Waller family sold the building in 2011, and it is a Panera Bread restaurant.

80th anniversary
February 6, 2015, marked the 80th anniversary of the first air date of KFRO in Longview.

References

External links

 DFW Radio/TV history
Grant Turner - Country Music Hall of Fame
East Texas Hillbilly Jamboree 1953

FRO
Radio stations established in 1935
Oldies radio stations in the United States